Chhattisgarh Swami Vivekanand Technical University (CSVTU) is a Public State University located in Bhilai, Chhattisgarh, India. On 30 April 2005, the foundation stone of the university was laid by the Prime Minister of India Manmohan Singh.

History

Establishment 
In early 2005 the State Government of Chhattisgarh decided to establish the university with the aim of providing "systematic, efficient and quality education" in the fields of engineering and technology. The relevant act was passed in the Chhattisgarh state assembly on 21 January 2005. Manmohan Singh, then Prime Minister of India, laid the foundation stone of the university in a ceremony held on 30 April 2005.

Land and financial aid by Bhilai Steel Plant 

Adopting industry-academia linkage system 
After the university adopted an "industry-academia linkage system", a similar system was adopted by five other state universities. The system apparently offers financial rewards for students working on industry-defined problems.

Management

Faculties 
 the university offers courses in seven sections which are: Engineering & Technology, Applied Science, Management & Entrepreneurship, Pharmacy, Architecture, Humanities and Ecology & Environment.

Reservation of seats for SAIL 

While the university was still in the planning stage, it was reported that 50 percent of certain postgraduate courses would be reserved for employees of the Steel Authority of India (SAIL), while a small number of places in other courses would be reserved for their children.

Affiliations 
The university affiliates a substantial number of Engineering and Polytechnics colleges in Chhattisgarh: over 60 Engineering colleges and 30 Polytechnics colleges are affiliated.

References 

Universities in Chhattisgarh
Educational institutions established in 2005
Education in Bhilai
2005 establishments in Chhattisgarh